The Railways in Ely are an important interchange point between several routes in England. There are junctions north and south of the city where rail routes from Suffolk and Norfolk connect with routes to London, the Midlands, the north of England, and Scotland. Several rail freight operating companies use these routes and four passenger train operating companies provide services through Ely.

Ely station

Ely railway station  is on the southeast edge of the city beside the River Great Ouse. The station is approx 70 miles (113 km) from London on the ex-GER (Great Eastern Railway) line from London to King's Lynn. Ely station has three platforms, all signalled for bi-directional running. Platform 1 is on the west of the station and is a facing platform backed by the main buildings. Platforms 2 and 3 are the two faces of an island platform. Generally speaking, London-King's Lynn services use platform 1 (down) and platform 2 (up) while east-to-west services use platform 3; however, the track layout and signalling allow any route to use any platform in either direction.

The original station was opened in 1845 but the Italianate main building has been much altered over the years. Most recently, the station was substantially upgraded in the early 1990s to coincide with overhead 25 kV AC electrification of the London to King's Lynn route. Until 1923 Ely station was owned and operated by the GER; from 1923 to 1948 by the London & North Eastern Railway (LNER); and from 1948 until privatisation in the 1990s by the Eastern Region of British Railways. The current station operator is Abellio Greater Anglia.

Ely North Junction
Ely North Junction is located at Queen Adelaide  approximately one-and-a-half miles (2 km) north of Ely station. From Ely North Junction the electrified ex-GER London-King's Lynn double-track main line (marketed as the Fen Line) runs north to Downham Market and King's Lynn. Two non-electrified double-track lines branch at North Junction: the line to Norwich (marketed as the Breckland Line) diverges to the northeast; the Ely to Peterborough Line to March and Peterborough diverges to the northwest. At Peterborough there is direct connection to the East Coast Main Line from London to Scotland and the Peterborough to Birmingham route.

Immediately east of Ely North Junction is Potter Distribution Depot which has substantial railfreight facilities. Cemex operates an asphalt and building materials depot at the site.

Ely West Curve
Ely West Curve (also known as the 'Adelaide loop', the 'Ely avoiding line' and the 'Ely freight loop') is a single-track loop which branches in the up direction from Ely North Junction. The loop turns through 180 degrees to re-join the Ely to Peterborough Line in the down (northbound) direction. Ely West Curve was laid in on 1 October 1890, to allow freight trains from the Midlands and north to run directly onto the King's Lynn and Norwich lines in the down (northbound) direction without reversal thus avoiding Ely station. Later, it was used by an increasing number of passenger trains, particularly holiday expresses to the Norfolk coast. In 1966 regular passenger traffic over the curve ceased. Currently there is one passenger train per week, in one direction only, which uses the Ely West Curve.  This is the East Midland Railway 15:54 Sunday service from Norwich to Manchester Piccadilly.

Ely Dock Junction

Ely Dock Junction is just under a mile south of Ely station   on the London-King's Lynn main line. From the junction, the non-electrified single-track Ely to Ipswich line diverges to the southeast. The line serves Newmarket, Bury St Edmunds and Ipswich where it connects with the ex-GER main line from London Liverpool Street station to Norwich.

Hawk Bridge is half-a-mile east of Ely Dock Junction  and carries the Newmarket line over the River Great Ouse. The original bridge was severely damaged by a freight train derailment which occurred on 22 June 2007. A replacement was erected, and opened on 20 December 2007. The new bridge carries a single line (as did the old) but has been built wide enough to allow the line to be doubled at a later date.

Images

References and sources

 British Railways Pre-Grouping Atlas and Gazetteer; W P Conolly; Ian Allan Ltd; published 1976; 
 Ordnance Survey: Landranger map sheet 143 Ely & Wisbech 
 Ordnance Survey: Explorer map sheet 228 March & Ely 
 Ordnance Survey: Explorer map sheet 226 Ely & Newmarket 
 Ely to Norwich; Richard Adderson and Graham Kenworthy; Middleton Press; published 2002; ; Pages 1–7
 Eastern Main Lines – Cambridge to Ely; Richard Adderson and Graham Kenworthy; Middleton Press; published 2005; 

Rail transport in Cambridgeshire
Railway lines in the East of England
Great Eastern Railway
London and North Eastern Railway
Ely, Cambridgeshire